Southern Valley Yokuts is a dialect network within the Valley Yokuts division of the Yokutsan languages spoken in the Central Valley of California.

Among the dialects grouped under the label Southern Valley Yokuts are Wechihi, Tachi, Telamni, Chunut, Wowol, Yawelmani, Nutunutu, Wo'lasi, Choynok, and Koyeti.

References 

Yokutsan languages